Georges Lignon (born 29 December 1968) is an Ivorian footballer. He played in 19 matches for the Ivory Coast national football team from 1987 to 1993. He was also named in Ivory Coast's squad for the 1990 African Cup of Nations tournament.

References

External links
 

1968 births
Living people
Ivorian footballers
Ivory Coast international footballers
1990 African Cup of Nations players
1992 King Fahd Cup players
Place of birth missing (living people)
Association football defenders
Africa Sports d'Abidjan players